Monastrol is a cell-permeable small molecule inhibitor discovered by Thomas U. Mayer in the lab of Tim Mitchison. Monastrol was shown to inhibit the kinesin-5 (also known as KIF11, Kinesin Eg5), a motor protein important for spindle bipolarity.

Mechanism of action

Monastrol binds to a long loop that is specific to the Eg5 (also known as KIF11 or kinesin-5) kinesin family, and allosterically inhibits ATPase activity of the kinesin

References

GABAA receptor positive allosteric modulators
GHB receptor agonists
Thioureas
Pyrimidines